Annai Oru Aalayam is a 1979 Indian Tamil-language adventure film directed by R. Thyagarajan. It was simultaneously shot in Telugu with the title Amma Evarikaina Amma. The film stars Rajinikanth as an animal hunter who helps a baby elephant to reach its mother. It was a commercial success and included music composed by Ilaiyaraaja. The film was a remake of the Hindi film Maa (1976).

Plot 

An animal hunter seeks to help a baby elephant reach its mother.

Cast

Production 
The elephant calf was played by Ganesh.

Soundtrack 
The soundtrack consists of six songs composed by Ilaiyaraaja with lyrics by Vaali. The song "Amma Nee Sumandha" is set in Charukesi raga.

References

External links 
 
 

1979 multilingual films
1970s Tamil-language films
1970s Telugu-language films
1979 films
Films about elephants
Films directed by R. Thyagarajan (director)
Films scored by Ilaiyaraaja
Indian multilingual films
Tamil remakes of Hindi films
Telugu remakes of Hindi films